The following list sorts countries by nonfinancial corporate debt as percentage of GDP according to data by the International Monetary Fund.

* indicates "Economy of COUNTRY or TERRITORY" links.

See also 

 List of countries by external debt
 List of countries by household debt
 List of countries by public debt
 World debt

References 

corporate debt
Corporate